Casual Acquaintances is a compilation album by American rock band The Growlers. The album was released on July 27, 2018 through Beach Goth Records. It contains out-take and B-sides from their fifth studio album, City Club.

Track listing

Who Loves the Scum – Single 
A single released not long after the album, most likely a demo along with its b-side from the same sessions as Casual Acquaintances.

References

External links 
 

2018 compilation albums
The Growlers albums